The Cushman School is a private school in Miami, Florida. Founded in 1924, the school serves about 740 students from pre-kindergarten through twelfth grade.

History
The Cushman School was founded in 1924 and is the oldest PK-12 private school in Miami. The school was named a Blue Ribbon School of Excellence in 1991-1992, is accredited by the Florida Council of Independent Schools, the Southern Association of Colleges and Schools and the Southern Association of Independent Schools and is a member of the National Association of Independent Schools.

The Cushman School is Miami-Dade County's oldest continuously operating private school.

The school consists of several small buildings, a mix of old and new structures, in a historic section of northeast Miami. Since its opening in 1924, the school has introduced approaches to education that include an educational psychology calling for broad student input in the learning process.

Arvi Balseiro is the school's headmaster. She is the third Head of School in the school's -year history and succeeded Joan Lutton, who was the Head of School for 32 years.  The founder, Laura Cushman, was Head for 57 years.

Academics
The curriculum includes Spanish, French, Italian, Mandarin Chinese and Latin.

Athletics
The Cushman School has sports including cross country, volleyball, swimming, track and field, soccer, basketball, baseball, tennis, beach volleyball and cheerleading.

Alumni
Evaluna Montaner, singer and actress

References

External links

Schools in Miami
Educational institutions established in 1924
Private middle schools in Florida
Private elementary schools in Florida
Private schools in Miami-Dade County, Florida
K–8 schools in Florida
1924 establishments in Florida